Eupithecia westonaria is a moth in the family Geometridae. It is found in Mexico.

The wingspan is about 16 mm for males and 17 mm for females. The forewings are greenish ocherous, thickly dusted with blackish scales. There are parallel straight dark lines and shades on the hindwings.

References

Moths described in 1906
westonaria
Moths of Central America